Ayfūʿ Asfal is a sub-district located in the Shar'ab as-Salam District, Taiz Governorate, Yemen. Ayfūʿ Asfal had a population of 9,046 according to the 2004 census.

Villages
Khabah village.
Al-qabul village.
Al-sana'at village.
Musar'a village.
Shaqahah village.
Banī 'Ubayd village.
Wadi Kahaal village.
Al-haql al-asfal village.
Al-riysiu village.

References

Sub-districts in Shar'ab as-Salam District